Narkuiyeh (also Romanized as Nārkū’īyeh) is a village in Khabar Rural District, in the Central District of Baft County, Kerman Province, Iran. At the 2006 census, its population was 35, in 6 families.

References 

Populated places in Baft County